This is a list of German states by unemployment rate as of November 2022 according to the Federal Statistical Office of Germany.

References

External links 
Federal Statistical Office
unemployment
unemployment
Unemployment
Germany, unemployment rate